Lorenzen is an unincorporated community in Sharkey County, Mississippi, United States.

Lorenzen had a post office, and a population of 76 in 1906.

Notes

Unincorporated communities in Sharkey County, Mississippi
Unincorporated communities in Mississippi